Majharia is a village in West Champaran district in the Indian state of Bihar.

Demographics
As of 2011 India census, Majharia had a population of 1074 in 202 households. Males constitute 54% of the population and females 45%. Majharia has an average literacy rate of 37.24%, lower than the national average of 74%: male literacy is 66.5%, and female literacy is 33.4%. In Majharia, 22.9% of the population is under 6 years of age.

References

Villages in West Champaran district